The Sassalb (also known as Sassalbo) is a mountain of the Livigno Alps, located in Graubünden, Switzerland. The mountain overlooks Poschiavo. The Sassalb lies south of Piz Sena. The border with Italy runs approximately 400 metres east of the summit.

References

External links
 Sassalb on Hikr

Mountains of the Alps
Mountains of Graubünden
Mountains partially in Italy
Mountains of Switzerland
Two-thousanders of Switzerland